Andy A. Gallik (born September 24, 1991) is a former American football center. He was drafted by the Tennessee Titans in the 2015 NFL Draft. He played college football for Boston College.

Early life
Gallik was born in Evergreen Park, Illinois. Gallik attended Brother Rice High School in Chicago.

College and professional career
Gallik attended Boston College, where he started all four years for the Eagles. 

He was drafted in the sixth round of the 2015 NFL draft by the Tennessee Titans. On August 28, 2016, he was waived/injured by the Titans and placed on injured reserve. He was released with an injury settlement on October 14, 2016.

References

1991 births
Living people
Boston College Eagles football players
People from Evergreen Park, Illinois
Players of American football from Illinois
Sportspeople from Cook County, Illinois
Tennessee Titans players
American football centers